Aboisso is a town in south-eastern Ivory Coast lying on the Soumié River. It is a sub-prefecture of the Aboisso Department for which it is also the seat of government. Aboisso is also a commune as well as the seat of government for the Sud-Comoé Region in Comoé District.

The town's population is primarily composed of the Anyi Sanwi ethnic group, a branch of the Akan people. Once part of the Krindjabo kingdom, the town also served as a staging point for Marcel Treich-Laplène's early explorations of Ivory Coast. The area is served by Aboisso Airport.

History 
Aboisso was the seat of the Sud-Comoé region from 1997 to 2011.
In 2014, the population of the sub-prefecture of Aboisso was 86,115.

Villages
The eighteen villages of the sub-prefecture of Aboisso and their population in 2014 are:

References

Sub-prefectures of Sud-Comoé
Communes of Sud-Comoé
Regional capitals of Ivory Coast